The Basilica of Sant'Apollinare Nuovo is a basilica church in Ravenna, Italy. It was erected by the Ostrogothic king Theodoric the Great as his palace chapel during the first quarter of the 6th century (as attested to in the Liber Pontificalis). This Arian church was originally dedicated in 504 AD to "Christ the Redeemer".

It was reconsecrated in 561 AD, under the rule of the Byzantine emperor Justinian I, under the new name "Sanctus Martinus in Coelo Aureo" ("Saint Martin in Golden Heaven"). Suppressing the Arian church, the church was dedicated to Saint Martin of Tours, a foe of Arianism. According to legend, Pope Gregory the Great ordered that the mosaics in the church be blackened, as their golden glory distracted worshipers from their prayers. The basilica was renamed again in 856 AD when relics of Saint Apollinaris were transferred from the Basilica of Sant'Apollinare in Classe because of the threat posed by frequent raids of pirates from the Adriatic Sea.

Its apse and atrium underwent modernization at various times, beginning in the 6th century with the destruction of mosaics whose themes were too overtly Arian or which expressed the king's glory, but the mosaics of the lateral walls, twenty-four columns with simplified Corinthian capitals, and an Ambo are preserved. On some columns, images of arms and hands can be seen, which are parts of figures once representing praying Goths and Theodoric's court, deleted in Byzantine times. Renovations (and alterations) were done to the mosaics in the mid-19th century by Felice Kibel. The present apse is a reconstruction after being damaged during World War I.

Architecture and decoration

On the upper band of the left lateral wall are 13 small mosaics, depicting Jesus' miracles and parables; and on the right wall are 13 mosaics depicting the Passion and Resurrection. However, the flagellation and crucifixion are lacking. They describe the parts of the Bible that were read aloud in the church during Lent under the rule of Theodoric the Great. On the left, Jesus is always depicted as young, beardless man, dressed as a Roman Emperor. On the right, Jesus is depicted with a beard. For the Arians, this emphasized that Jesus grew older and became a "man of sorrows", as spoken of by the prophet Isaiah. These mosaics are separated by decorative mosaic panels depicting a shell-shaped niche with a tapestry, cross, and two doves. These mosaics were executed by at least two artists.

The next row of mosaics are a scheme of haloed saints, prophets and evangelists, sixteen on each side. The figures are executed in a Hellenistic-Roman tradition and show a certain individuality of expression as compared to the other figures in the basilica. Each individual depicted holds a book, in either scroll or codex format, and, like many of the other figures throughout the basilica, each of their robes has a mark or symbol in it. These mosaics alternate with windows. They were executed in the time of Theodoric.

The row below contains large mosaics in Byzantine style, lacking any individuality, having all identical expressions. These were executed about 50 years after the time of bishop Agnellus (d. 570), when the church had already become an orthodox church. To the left is a procession of the 22 Virgins of the Byzantine period, led by the Three Magi, moving from the city of Classe towards the group of the Madonna and Child surrounded by four angels. (The Magi in this mosaic are named Balthasar, Melchior and Gaspar; this is thought to be the earliest example of these three names being assigned to the Magi in Christian art.) To the right is a similar procession of 26 Martyrs, led by Saint Martin and including Saint Apollinaris, moving from the Palace of Theodoric towards a group representing Christ enthroned amid four angels. This lower band, containing a schematic representation of the Palace of Theoderic on the right wall and the port of Classe with three ships on the left wall, gives us a certain idea of the architecture in Ravenna during the time of Theodoric. In another part of the church there is a rough mosaic containing the portrait of the Emperor Justinian.

The entrance of the church is preceded by a marble portico built in the 16th century. Next to the church, on the right side of the portico, stands a round bell tower dating from the 9th or 10th century.

When the UNESCO inscribed the church on the World Heritage List, its experts pointed out that "both the exterior and interior of the basilica graphically illustrate the fusion between the western and eastern styles characteristic of the late 5th to early 6th century. This is one of the most important buildings from the period of crucial cultural significance in European religious art".

Some art historians claim that one of the mosaics contains the first depiction of Satan in western art. In the mosaic, a blue angel appears to the left hand side of Jesus behind three goats (mentioned in St Matthew's account of Judgement Day).

Gallery

Notes

References

Further reading
Weitzmann, Kurt, ed., Age of spirituality: late antique and early Christian art, third to seventh century, no. 248, 1979, Metropolitan Museum of Art, New York, ; full text available online from The Metropolitan Museum of Art Libraries

External links

Unesco World Heritage Official Site
Adrian Fletcher's Paradoxplace Ravenna Pages (photos)
122 images from Bridgeman Art Library
Studies of the mosaics lining the walls of the nave, in the Christian Iconography website
Official Ravenna tourist information website 

Palaeo-Christian architecture in Ravenna
Basilica churches in Ravenna
Byzantine sacred architecture
Mosaics
Buildings of Justinian I
Ostrogothic art
Early Christian art
Theoderic the Great